"Celestica" is the first single from Crystal Castles' second album, Crystal Castles. The single was released digitally as an EP, featuring the three B-sides on the Doe Deer 12" EP. This single also included a single mix of "Celestica". A no-budget video for the track was released as well, directed by Rob Hawkins, a friend of the band. No official artwork has been presented for the single.

The song is said to have some relation to the Canadian factory Celestica in which Ethan Kath said that one of the workers allegedly committed suicide by jumping into a tub of hot plastic and that they still used the plastic to make products.

Track listing
"Celestica" (album mix) – 3:50
"Seed" (2004 version) – 1:48
"Insectica" (2004 version) – 1:42
"Mother Knows Best" (2004 version) – 2:01
"Celestica" (single mix) – 3:47

Personnel
Ethan Kath – instruments, production, mixing
Alice Glass – vocals, lyrics

References

2010 singles
Crystal Castles (band) songs
2010 songs
Fiction Records singles
Songs written by Ethan Kath